José Mariano Beristáin y Martín de Souza (22 May 1756 – 23 March 1817) was a Mexican bibliographer and author of one of the principal sources of knowledge of the bibliography of Mexico and Central America.

Biography
He was born in Puebla, Mexico, but went to Spain and spent some time in the family of the former bishop of Puebla, then Archbishop of Toledo. Returning to Mexico (1811) he was made archdeacon of the Metropolitan church of Mexico (1813), and was afterwards its dean. Beristain was a secular priest who had made thorough studies in Mexico and perfected them in Spain under the favourable circumstances. He wrote a number of treatises, some of them on economic subjects, but hardly any were published, the manuscripts being mostly lost in sending them to Europe. He died in Mexico.

His magnum opus is the Biblioteca hispano-americana septentrional, the last part of which was published after his death. For this he used as a basis the Biblioteca mexicana of Bishop Juan José de Eguiara y Eguren of which only the first volume (as far as "J") appeared in print. Beristáin at first intended to republish Eguiara, completing the alphabet by means of sketches and notes left by the author, but, as he proceeded to carry out the idea, he found that it would be preferable to compose an independent bibliography, incorporating in it the material Eguiara had collected. of Beristain's Biblioteca contains many errors in names and dates. Taking into account the time when he wrote, and the distances from sources and their frequent inaccessibility, it has been considered by many as a monumental work.

References

External links
 

19th-century Mexican historians
1756 births
1817 deaths
Mexican people of Basque descent
Writers from Puebla